Fibroblast growth factor 13 is a protein that in humans is encoded by the FGF13 gene.

The protein encoded by this gene is a member of the fibroblast growth factor (FGF) family. FGF family members possess broad mitogenic and cell survival activities, and are involved in a variety of biological processes, including embryonic development, cell growth, morphogenesis, tissue repair, tumor growth, and invasion. This gene is located to a region associated with Börjeson-Forssman-Lehmann syndrome (BFLS), a syndromal X-linked intellectual disability, which suggests it may be a candidate gene for familial cases of the BFL syndrome. The function of this gene has not yet been determined. Two alternatively spliced transcripts encoding different isoforms have been described for this gene.

References

Further reading